Susann is a given name and surname. Notable persons with that name include:

Persons with the given name
Susann-Annette Storm (born 1957), German attorney and university chancellor
Susann B. Winter (fl. 1970s–present), German actress (also credited as Susanne Winter; Susan B Winter)
Susann Cokal (fl. 1990s–present), US author and academic
Susann Goksør Bjerkrheim (born 1970), Norwegian athlete in handball
Susann Götz, German athlete in ice hockey
Susann Korda, stage name of Spanish dancer, singer, film actress Soledad Miranda (1943–1970)
Susann McDonald (born 1935), US musician (harpist)
Susann Müller (born 1988), German athlete in handball

Sussan
Sussan Taunton (born 1970), Mexican actress

Persons with the surname
Jacqueline Susann (1918–1974), US author

See also
Susan
Susanne (given name)